Endococcus is a genus of lichenicolous (lichen-dwelling) in the family Lichenotheliaceae. It has 44 species. The genus was circumscribed by the Finnish botanist William Nylander in 1855. Although at least one source places the genus in the Verrucariaceae, a 2016 study of the type species, Endococcus rugulosus, determined that it should instead be placed in the family Lichenotheliaceae of the order Dothideales; this classification echoes a placement proposed in 1979 by David Hawksworth.

Species

Endococcus alectoriae 
Endococcus apicicola 
Endococcus brachysporus 
Endococcus caudisporus 
Endococcus cladiae 
Endococcus exerrans 
Endococcus freyi 
Endococcus fusiger 
Endococcus hafellneri 
Endococcus hafellnerianus 
Endococcus incrassatus 
Endococcus janae 
Endococcus karlstadtensis 
Endococcus macrosporus 
Endococcus matzeri 
Endococcus nanellus 
Endococcus oreinae 
Endococcus oropogonicola 
Endococcus pallidosporus 
Endococcus parentium 
Endococcus parmeliarum 
Endococcus peltigericola 
Endococcus perminutus 
Endococcus physciae 
Endococcus propinquus 
Endococcus protoblasteniae 
Endococcus pseudocyphellariae 
Endococcus ramalinarius 
Endococcus rugulosus 
Endococcus sardous 
Endococcus sendtneri 
Endococcus sipmanii 
Endococcus thamnoliae 
Endococcus thelommatis 
Endococcus tricolorans 
Endococcus umbilicariae 
Endococcus variabilis 
Endococcus verrucisporus 
Endococcus verrucosus 
Endococcus xanthoparmeliae 
Endococcus zahlbrucknerellae

References

Dothideomycetes
Dothideomycetes genera
Taxa named by William Nylander (botanist)
Taxa described in 1855